Emine Aiiarovna Dzhaparova (or Dzheppar; , ; born 5 May 1983) is a Crimean Tatar-Ukrainian journalist, editor, television presenter, and politician. She was appointed the First Deputy Minister of Foreign Affairs of Ukraine in 2020.

Career 
From October 2015 to April 2016 she was appointed advisor on Crimea to the Minister of Information Policy. From 20 April 2016 she was appointed Deputy Minister of Information Policy. On 3 September 2019 she submitted her resignation.

From 18 May 2020 she has served as First Deputy Minister of Foreign Affairs under Dmytro Kuleba, and as head of the Ukrainian National Commission on UNESCO. In this post she is responsible for the Crimea Platform diplomatic initiative for recovering control of the Russian-occupied Crimean peninsula.

References

External links 

 
 

Ukrainian diplomats
Ukrainian women diplomats
21st-century Ukrainian women politicians
Taras Shevchenko National University of Kyiv, Institute of International Relations alumni
Ukrainian women journalists
Commons category link is on Wikidata
1983 births
Living people
People from Krasnodar
Ukrainian people of Crimean Tatar descent